The 2014 South Africa Sevens was the second tournament within the 2014-2015 Sevens World Series. It was held over the weekend of 13–14 December 2014 at Nelson Mandela Bay Stadium in Port Elizabeth, South Africa.

Format
The teams are drawn into four pools of four teams each. Each team plays every other team in their pool once. The top two teams from each pool advance to the Cup/Plate brackets. The bottom two teams from each group go to the Bowl/Shield brackets.

Teams
The 16 participating teams for the tournament:

Match officials
The match officials for the 2014 South Africa Sevens are as follows:

  Mike Adamson (Scotland)
  Federico Anselmi (Argentina)
  Nick Briant (New Zealand)
  Ben Crouse (South Africa)
  Richard Kelly (New Zealand)
  Anthony Moyes (Australia)
  Matt O'Brien (Australia)
  Rasta Rasivhenge (South Africa)
  Marius van der Westhuizen (South Africa)

Pool Stage

Pool A

Pool B

Pool C

Pool D

Knockout stage

Shield

Bowl

Plate

Cup

Scoring

Source: WR website

References

External links
Men's Official website
Women's Official website

South Africa Sevens
South Africa Sevens
2014 in South African rugby union